Interstate 81 (I-81) is a north–south (physically northeast–southwest) Interstate Highway in the eastern part of the United States. Its southern terminus is at I-40 in Dandridge, Tennessee; its northern terminus is on Wellesley Island, New York at the Canadian border, where the Thousand Islands Bridge connects it to Highway 137 and ultimately to Highway 401, the main Ontario freeway connecting Detroit via Toronto to Montreal. The major metropolitan areas along the route of I-81 include the Tri-Cities of Tennessee; Roanoke in Virginia; Harrisburg and the Wyoming Valley in Pennsylvania; and Syracuse in New York.

I-81 largely traces the paths created down the length of the Appalachian Mountains through the Great Appalachian Valley by migrating animals, indigenous peoples, and early settlers. It also follows a major corridor for troop movements during the Civil War. These trails and roadways gradually evolved into US Route 11 (US 11); I-81 parallels much of the older US 11. Being mostly rural in nature, I-81 is heavily used as a trucking corridor and is often used as a bypass of busier and more congested Interstates to the east such as I-95; for this reason, it is also used heavily by drug and human traffickers, as it is less monitored by law enforcement than I-95. This led to the Federal Bureau of Investigation (FBI) forming a taskforce to combat the issue in 2017.

The I-81 Corridor Coalition, a six-state coalition, was organized to handle issues along I-81, such as truck traffic and air pollution; the commission meets annually. I-81 is part of the fastest route between the capital of the US (Washington, DC) and the capital of Canada (Ottawa) and Mexico (Mexico City).

Route description 
I-81 is part of the National Highway System, a network of highways that are considered essential to the country's economy, defense, and mobility by the Federal Highway Administration (FHWA).
|-
| TN || 
|-
| VA || 
|-
| WV || 
|-
| MD || 
|-
| PA || 
|-
| NY || 
|-
| Total || 
|}

Tennessee 

I-81 begins in Tennessee at I-40 in Dandridge, a route that connects to Knoxville to the west and Asheville to the east. I-81 meets I-26 and US 23, which go to Kingsport and Johnson City. At milemarker 75, I-81 leaves Tennessee and enters Virginia.

Virginia 

I-81 in Virginia is largely a rural route with brief concurrencies with I-77 and I-64. The route parallels the Appalachian Mountains for much of its route through Tennessee and Virginia, serving such cities as the twin cities of Bristol, Tennessee and Virginia; Wytheville; Roanoke; Christiansburg; Lexington; Staunton; Harrisonburg; and Winchester. In Harrisonburg, I-81 cuts through James Madison University. It parallels its older counterpart, US 11, for its entire length in Virginia.

West Virginia 

The entire routing is in Berkeley County and serves the Eastern WV Regional Airport. The West Virginia segment was completed in 1966 and there have been no realignments since.

Maryland 

In Maryland, the Interstate Highway runs  from the West Virginia state line at the Potomac River in Williamsport north to the Pennsylvania state line near Maugansville. I-81 is the primary north–south Interstate Highway in Washington County, connecting Hagerstown with Chambersburg and Harrisburg to the north and Martinsburg, Winchester, and Roanoke to the south. It is the shortest mainline Interstate in Maryland and contains the shortest portion of I-81 of all six states through which the Interstate highway passes. The Interstate was dedicated as Maryland Veterans Memorial Highway in 1987. I-81 passes through the state of Maryland at one of its narrowest points, the "Hub City" of Hagerstown where it intersects with a large number of other routes, most notably I-70. Hagerstown Regional Airport is served by this Interstate Highway.

Pennsylvania 

I-81 forms a major north–south corridor through the state of Pennsylvania, serving the boroughs of Chambersburg and Carlisle, where it meets the Pennsylvania Turnpike (I-76) but does not directly interchange with it (motorists must use US 11 to connect). Around the state capital of Harrisburg, the route forms the northern section of Pennsylvania's Capital Beltway. The route then travels northeast toward the Wyoming Valley, where it serves the cities of Wilkes-Barre and Scranton, then heads north through the Endless Mountains region toward the state line.

New York 

In New York, I-81 crosses the Pennsylvania state line southeast of Binghamton. The freeway runs north–south through Central New York, serving the cities of Binghamton, Syracuse, and Watertown. It passes through the Thousand Islands in its final miles and crosses two bridges, both part of the series of bridges known as the Thousand Islands Bridge. South of Watertown, I-81 closely parallels US 11, the main north–south highway in Central New York prior to the construction of I-81. At Watertown, US 11 turns northeastward to head across New York's North Country while I-81 continues on a generally northward track to the Canadian border. From there, the road continues into the province of Ontario as Highway 137, a short route leading north to the nearby Highway 401.

History 

I-81 roughly parallels the Great Indian Warpath, an old Indian trail that connected New York to the Piedmont via Virginia and West Virginia. A series of roads linking Virginia to Maryland through Martinsburg were present on maps as early as 1873. New York was originally served by New York State Route 2 (NY 2), a road built in 1924; NY 2 was replaced by US 11 in 1927. A highway that largely followed the path of US 11 was built and became known as the Penn-Can Highway. On August 14, 1957 the highway was redesigned as I-81. In New York, the first segments of I-81 were begun in 1954. In Maryland, the Interstate was begun with the Hagerstown Bypass in the mid-1950s. After several bouts of expansion, the freeway was completed from US 40 (now Maryland Route 144 [MD 144]) to the Pennsylvania state line in 1958 and marked as I-81 in 1959. Bidding on contracts in West Virginia opened in July 1958. In Virginia, the first Interstate hearing was held in February 1957. At the end of 1957, construction began on a  stretch near Buchanan, Virginia. A  section of the Interstate opened in 1959. A stretch in Harrisonburg was opened as well. By late 1963,  in Virginia were open.

The first statewide segment to be completed was that of West Virginia, which was finished in 1966. The section opened on October 19, 1966. In western Maryland, various parts of I-81 were built in the early 1960s, and the remainder of the highway south to the Potomac River was under construction by 1965 and opened in 1966. Since then, I-81 in Maryland has remained largely unchanged. Construction was expected to be finished in 1969, but a large portion of the work would not be completed until 1974, and most of the road was open by December 1974. The final major segment of the Interstate in the north to be built was a  section in New York, opened in October 1968. That same year, work in Pennsylvania was completed. The road would not be completely built in Tennessee until August 1975. Construction on parts in Virginia dragged on until it was finished in July 1987. The segment in New York cost $270 million (equivalent to $ in ) to build.

Major intersections 
Tennessee
  near Dandridge, northeast of Knoxville
  between the Tri-Cities
Virginia
  in Bristol
  in Roanoke
  in Lexington; they stay joined through Staunton.
  in Harrisonburg
  in Middletown
Maryland
  in Hagerstown
  in Hagerstown
Pennsylvania
 in Middlesex Township (near Carlisle)
  in Enola
  in Harrisburg. I-81/US 322 stays joined throughout Harrisburg.
  in Harrisburg
  near Jonestown
  near Hazleton
  in Dupont (near Pittston)
  in Dunmore (near Scranton)
  in Clarks Summit
New York
  in Binghamton
  in Binghamton
  in Syracuse
  in downtown Syracuse
  in North Syracuse
  in Watertown
 ; freeway ends at Canada–US border (Thousand Islands Bridge)

Auxiliary routes 
I-81 has six related, auxiliary Interstate Highways that connect the main freeway to downtowns and other cities. I-381 runs , connecting Bristol, Virginia, to I-81. I-581 is a  spur that connects Roanoke, Virginia, to I-81. It is proposed to be overtaken by I-73. Pennsylvania Route 581 (PA 581) connects Harrisburg, Pennsylvania, to I-81. It runs . I-481 serves as an eastern bypass of Syracuse, New York.

I-181 was a  offshoot of I-81, linking to Kingsport, Tennessee. It was decommissioned in August 2005 when I-26 took over I-181's entire length. I-281 was replaced in January 1970 by I-481. I-81E was replaced by the current I-380.

References

External links 

 
 Thousand Islands Bridge System, showing the bridges and connections at the northern terminus
 Economic Development History of Interstate 81 in Virginia, a Federal Highway Administration report.

 
81